Amoeba Gig is a live album by Paul McCartney taken from the recordings of a secret performance at Amoeba Music in Hollywood, California, on 27 June 2007, and released in July 2019. Tracks from the recordings were previously released in 2007 on Amoeba's Secret and as B-sides to the single "Ever Present Past." The album features the complete concert recording of that secret performance.

Background
Paul McCartney and his touring band played a secret show at Amoeba Music in Hollywood, California, as part of the promotion for Memory Almost Full on 27 June 2007. The performance was later released in November 2007 as Amoeba's Secret, a limited edition 12" vinyl record, and again in January 2009 on CD. Three tracks from the Amoeba's Secret release were also released as B-sides for the "Ever Present Past" single in November 2007. In 2010, the set was released as Live in Los Angeles, a 12-track CD version given away free with the Daily Mail newspaper. In 2012, an extended version of the Daily Mail CD was released by Paul McCartney's website, adding two additional tracks. The complete Amoeba Gig show, with all 21 songs and remixed by McCartney's engineer Steve Orchard, was finally released on 12 July 2019 on CD, vinyl, and digital download.

Track listing

Personnel
Paul McCartney – lead vocals, bass, guitar, mandolin, keyboards
Rusty Anderson – guitar, vocals
Abe Laboriel Jr. – drums, vocals
Brian Ray – guitar, bass, vocals
David Arch – keyboards
Steve Orchard – 2019 remix sound engineer

Charts

References

External links 
 
 
 Paul McCartney Rocked Amoeba at Amoeba Music official website
 Paul McCartney's - Amoeba's Secret at Graham Calkin's Beatles Pages

2019 live albums
Paul McCartney live albums
Capitol Records live albums